Kings Flow is located southeast of Indian Lake, New York. Fish species present in the lake are largemouth bass, yellow perch, white sucker, rock bass, black bullhead, and sunfish. Access by state trails on private lands with permission from landowners. No motors are allowed on this lake.

References

Lakes of New York (state)
Lakes of Hamilton County, New York